Oklahoma Alliance is an American women’s soccer team, founded in 2007. The team is a member of the Women's Premier Soccer League, the second tier of women’s soccer in the United States and Canada. The team plays in the South Division of the Big Sky Conference.

In earlier seasons the team played its home games in the stadium on the campus of Chickasha High School in the city of Chickasha, Oklahoma, but the team moved to the pitches of the Edmond Soccer Club in Edmond, Oklahoma—a city in the Oklahoma City metropolitan area. The club's colors are black and white.

Players

2011 Roster 

Jackie Acevedo
Baily Boulware
Katie Bykowski
Jordan Calhoun
Rachel Cano-Garcia
Lauren Carter
Chelsea Cody
Callie Cooper
Carmen Davis
Brook Degaffenreid
Colleen Dougherty
Taylor Fain
Alison Farrell
Kaylie Garcia
Alexandria "Dria" Hampton
Abby Hodgen
Danielle Hughes
Alissa Jones
Kelli Korleski
Kylie Ann Louw
Madison Mercado
Melinda Mercado
Kira Michelson-Bartlett
Caitlin Mooney
Amy Petrekin
Annika Niemeier
Addison Tipton
Jordan White
Megan Wilkerson
Annie Zoch

Notable former players
Melinda Mercado (Played Professionally in the NWSL)
Jackie Acevedo (Played Professionally in the WPSL Elite & NWSL)

Year-by-year

Honors
 WPSL Big Sky South Division Champions 2008
 WPSL Big Sky Conference Champions 2010-Tied for 3rd in the WPSL national final four tournament.
 Finished the 2011 regular season averaging 4.18 goals scored per game.

Competition history
Most of the teams that the Alliance competes against are from Oklahoma, Arkansas or Texas. The inter-state and border state rivalries between these teams tends to promote "very spirited" competition.

Coaches
  Jimmy Hampton 2008–2011

Stadia
 Stadium at Chickasha High School, Chickasha, Oklahoma 2008-2009.
 Stadium at Edmond Soccer Club #4 1502 W. Danforth  Edmond, OK. 2010-

Average attendance
Approx. 60 people per game average in 2010 & 2011.

References

External links
 Official Site
 WPSL teams page

Women's Premier Soccer League teams
Women's soccer clubs in Oklahoma
2007 establishments in Oklahoma